Shiva N'Zigou (born 24 October 1983 in Tchibanga) is a Gabonese former footballer who last played as a striker for French club Saint-Nazaire AF.

Career
A striker, he arrived in the famous Nantes youth system in 1998 and played his first senior match in 2002. He spent the 2004/05 season on loan to FC Gueugnon, but after only one season he was transferred to Reims. In 2011, he joined Belgian Third Division team Royal Excelsior Virton as a free agent after his contract at Reims expired.

Background
N'Zigou is the youngest player who has ever played in the Africa Cup of Nations. At 16 years and 93 days, he scored on his debut for Gabon in a 3-1 loss to South Africa at 2000 Africa Cup of Nations and is also the youngest player ever to score in the competition. However, he admitted in 2018 that he lied about age and that he is 5 years older than alleged. However, mathematicians have worked out that he would still have been at least eighteen at that tournament.

International goals
Scores and results list Gabon's goal tally first.

References

External links
 Shiva Star N'Zigou - Footgoal.net

1983 births
Living people
Gabonese footballers
Gabon international footballers
2000 African Cup of Nations players
Gabonese expatriate footballers
Association football forwards
FC Nantes players
FC Gueugnon players
Stade de Reims players
R.E. Virton players
Union Royale Namur Fosses-La-Ville players
Vendée Fontenay Foot players
Ligue 1 players
Ligue 2 players
Gabonese expatriate sportspeople in France
Gabonese expatriate sportspeople in Belgium
Expatriate footballers in France
Expatriate footballers in Belgium
People from Nyanga Province
21st-century Gabonese people